The Wells Creek Formation is a geologic formation in West Virginia. It dates back to the Ordovician period.

References
 Generalized Stratigraphic Chart for West Virginia

Ordovician West Virginia
Ordovician Ohio